Muasdale is a hamlet on the western coast of the Kintyre Peninsula of Scotland.  As of the year 2000 Muasdale had a population of 300. By the year 1750 the Roy map showed a coastal track along the west coast of Kintyre, even though the population level of the entire southern peninsula was very low.

See also
 Campbeltown

Line notes

References
 Robin Smith and Alan Lawson. 2000. The making of Scotland: a comprehensive guide to the growth of its cities, 992 pages

Villages in Kintyre